My Love is a 1970 Bollywood romance film directed by S. Sukhdev. The film stars Shashi Kapoor and Sharmila Tagore.

Cast
Shashi Kapoor as Raj Kumar Rai
Sharmila Tagore as Sangeeta Thakur 
Nirupa Roy as Durga (Raj's Aunty)
Madan Puri as Pran Mehra 
Rajendra Nath as Tom Genda 
Azra as Rani Mehta
Laxmi Chhaya as Laxmi 
Raj Mehra as Mr. Mehta (Rani's Father) 
Jayant as Mr. Rai (Raj's Father) 
Iftekhar as Doctor  
Sulochana Chatterjee as Sangeeta's Mother 
Manorama as Tom's Mother 
Pinchoo Kapoor as Tom's Father

Soundtrack
All lyrics were penned by Anand Bakshi.

Reception
The reviewer for The Indian Express called the film a "lukewarm, lifeless affair irredeemable even by Shashi Kapoor's sterling performance."

References

External links
 

1970 films
1970s Hindi-language films
1970s romance films
Indian romance films
Hindi-language romance films